Celosia virgata, or albahaca, is found in Puerto Rico and the Virgin Islands but not in the continental United States.  It is a perennial subshrub.

References

virgata
Taxa named by Nikolaus Joseph von Jacquin
Flora of Puerto Rico
Flora without expected TNC conservation status